Novosyolka Nerlskaya is a rural locality (a selo) in Seletskoye Rural Settlement, Suzdalsky District, Vladimir Oblast, Russia. The population was 30 as of 2010. There are 8 streets.

Geography 
Novosyolka Nerlskaya is located on the Nerl River, 8 km east of Suzdal (the district's administrative centre) by road. Kideksha is the nearest rural locality.

References 

Rural localities in Suzdalsky District